Jean de Pardaillan was a fourteenth century Catholic Bishop of Oloron in France.

He was Bishop of Oloron from 1 May 1491 until his resignation in 1500. After his resignation the diocese was Administered for 25 years by Cardinals Juan López, Amanieu d'Albret and Giovanni Salviati.

References 

Bishops of Oloron
15th-century French Roman Catholic bishops